The Battle of Frisches Haff or Battle of Stettiner Haff was a naval battle between Sweden and Prussia that took place 10 September 1759 as part of the ongoing Seven Years' War. The battle took place in the Szczecin Lagoon between Neuwarp and Usedom, and is named after an ambiguous earlier name for the Lagoon, Frisches Haff, which later exclusively denoted the Vistula Lagoon.

Swedish naval forces consisting of 28 vessels and 2,250 men under Captain Lieutenant Carl Rutensparre and Wilhelm von Carpelan destroyed a Prussian force of 13 vessels and 700 men under captain von Köller. The consequence of the battle was that the small fleet Prussia had at its disposal ceased to exist. The loss of naval supremacy meant also that the Prussian positions at Usedom and Wollin became untenable and were occupied by Swedish troops.

Background
At the outbreak of the conflict, Sweden was led by a government dominated by the pro-French Caps party, which felt that this war (mainly aimed against Prussia) was the chance for Sweden to recapture territories lost to Prussia in the past in Pomerania and restore the mouth of the Oder to Swedish control. The chancellor and head of the Caps party, baron Anders Johan von Höpken, sent an army of 14,500 men to Stralsund, capital of Swedish Pomerania, under field-marshal Ungern-Sternberg, with his main mission being the capture of Stettin (today in Poland), which controls the mouths of the Oder.

The Swedes launched a first offensive but were beaten back in Stralsund by the Prussian army under marshal Lehwaldt. Ungern-Sternberg was replaced by count von Rosen, who took no risks and left himself blockaded in Stralsund. However, a Russian offensive in west Prussia forced Lehwaldt to leave Swedish Pomerania on 27 June 1758. Sweden sent reinforcements and a new commander-in-chief, count Hamilton, who profited from Prussian difficulties by going back on the offensive. Although Prussian troops in the area had been heavily denuded to face the Russian threat, they put up a tenacious resistance to the Swedes and battles and skirmishes came one after the other without either of the belligerents able to gain a decisive advantage over the other. The conflict took a naval turn when the Prussians built a fleet at Stettin, by the more or less fortunate transformation of fishing or transport boats into warships, to defy a Swedish squadron supporting their land offensive. Informed of these preparations, the Swedes decided to destroy this fleet.

Battle
At the start of August 1759, the Swedish squadron under Ruthensparre moved into the Oder, moving towards the Stettin lagoon. On 8 August it forced the defences of Peenemünde and penetrated the western half of the lagoon (called Kleines Haff, or Little Lagoon, by the Germans). On 22 August the Swedes won an initial engagement against a fleet under captain von Köller off Anclam. On 10 September, the two fleets again faced each other, near Neuwarp. The Swedish ships commanded by Wilhelm von Carpellan were ranged in 4 lines - in the first were the most powerful ships (four 13-gun galleys armed), then four 5-gun demi-galleys (with mixed sail and oar propulsion), then 3 sloops and 1 ship with howitzers, and finally a line of 13 gunboats. For their part, the Prussians had four galiots and four galleys with 12 cannon each as well as 5 canonnières. Once within range, the Swedes placed themselves in a single line. However, the three Swedish demi-galleys and 9 gunboats sailed towards the south where unidentified sailing vessels had appeared - these turned out to be neutral ships, but this meant these Swedish ships did not take part in the start of the four-hour battle. The battle ended in a heavy Prussian defeat, with their main ships sunk or captured and more than 600 of their sailors captured, for smaller losses (13 killed and 14 wounded) on the Swedish side.

Aftermath
The victory guaranteed Swedish control of the lagoon, which they exploited by capturing the island of Wollin. However, their ultimate goal of Stettin remained in Prussian hands. Undaunted, the Prussians began to build a new fleet. The Battle of Frisches Haff was thus a short-lived victory for the Swedes and the Russian retreat from the war of 1762 placed them in a very difficult situation. Realising they did not have a large enough force to hold off the redoubtable troops under king Frederick II of Prussia on their own, the Swedes proposed a peace settlement to him based on a return to the pre-war status quo. Frederick accepted the proposal and formalised it by signing the treaty of Hamburg on 22 May 1762.

Order of battle
 Sweden
 Carlskrona, galley, 13 cannon
 Cronoborg, galley, 13 cannon
 Malmö, galley, 13 cannon
 Blecking, galley, 13 cannon
 Svärdfisk, half-galley, 5 cannon
 Delphin, half-galley, 5 cannon
 Cabilliou, half-galley, 5 cannon
 Stor, half-galley, 5 cannon
 1 ship armed with howitzers
 3 sloops
 13 gunboats
Prussia
 Kœnig von Preussen, galiot, 14 cannon
 Prinz von Preussen, galiot, 14 cannon
 Kœnig Heinrich, galiot, 14 cannon
 Kœnig Wilhelm, galiot, 14 cannon
 Jupiter, galley, 11 cannon
 Mars, galley, 11 cannon
 Neptunus, galley, 10 cannon
 Merkurius, galley, 10 cannon
 5 gunboats

References

Bibliography
 
 

Frisches Haff
Frisches Haff
Frisches Haff
History of Pomerania
Frisches Haff
1759 in Europe
1759 in the Holy Roman Empire